Lithopolyporales is a genus of fungi in the family Polyporaceae. This is a monotypic genus, containing the single species Lithopolyporales zeerabadensis.

External links
Lithopolyporales at Index Fungorum

Polyporaceae
Monotypic Polyporales genera